Eccopsis praecedens is a moth of the family Tortricidae. It is found in western, central, eastern and southern Africa, including the islands of São Tomé, Cape Verde, Madagascar and Réunion.

Larvae of this species had been stated on Cassia fistula (Fabaceae).

References

Further reading

External links
westafricanlepidoptera.com: Pictures of Eccopsis praecedens

Moths described in 1897
Olethreutini
Moths of Africa